The 1984 West Virginia gubernatorial election took place on November 6, 1984, to elect the governor of West Virginia. Until 2020, this was the last time West Virginia voted for the Republican candidate for Governor and for President, as both elections are held concurrently in the state.

Results

Democratic primary

General election

References

1984
gubernatorial
West Virginia